

Archosauromorphs

Newly named birds

Newly named dinosaurs

References